Anta is a town in southern Peru, capital of Anta Province in Cusco Region.

Climate

References

Populated places in the Cusco Region